Almost a Husband is a lost 1919 American comedy film directed by Clarence G. Badger and written by Robert F. Hill. It is based on the 1897 novel Old Ebenezer by Opie Read. The film stars Will Rogers, Peggy Wood, Herbert Standing, Cullen Landis, Clara Horton, and Ed Brady. The film was released on October 12, 1919, by Goldwyn Pictures.

Plot
A New England schoolteacher moves to a small Southern town and comes to the aid of many local people, including a young woman who faces unwanted romantic advances from another man. He pretends to marry the woman, but their marriage ends up being real.

Cast       
Will Rogers as Sam Lyman
Peggy Wood as Eva McElwyn
Herbert Standing as Banker McElwyn
Cullen Landis as Jerry Wilson
Clara Horton as Jane Sheldon
Ed Brady as Zeb Sawyer
Sidney De Gray as John Carruthers
Gus Saville as Jasper Stagg
Guinn "Big Boy" Williams (*uncredited)
Mary Jane Irving (*uncredited)

References

External links

1910s English-language films
Silent American comedy films
1919 comedy films
Goldwyn Pictures films
Films directed by Clarence G. Badger
American silent feature films
American black-and-white films
Lost American films
1919 lost films
Lost comedy films
1910s American films